The Doveton Football Club is an Australian rules football club which plays in the Southern FNL.

History

Founded in 1959, the Doves commenced senior football in the South West Gippsland Football League, taking a decade to win their first premiership in 1969. Doveton seeking greater competition transferred to the strong Federal Football League for five years from 1972. The club won 22 games out of 86 games.

The club returned to the SWGFL in 1977 and was particularly successful during the late 1970s and early 1980s when it won four premierships in six years.

In 1995 the SWGFL was absorbed by the Mornington Peninsula Nepean Football League and Doveton regularly made the finals but never won a Grand Final. The club won the premiership in the Casey Cardinia League 2015 grand final by defeating Narre Warren.

Doveton was one of nine founding clubs of the South East Football Netball League in 2015. Four years later the league merged with the Yarra Valley Mountain Football League to create the Outer East Football Netball League where, competing in  Division One competition, they won the Grand Final against Pakenham.

The club moved to the Southern FNL in 2022 after two years of Covid interrupted seasons.

Leagues and Premierships
 South West Gippsland FL (1959-1971)
 1969
 Federal Football League (1972-1976)
 No premierships
 South West Gippsland FL (1977-1994)
 1983, 1984, 1985, 1988
 Mornington Peninsula Nepean FL (1995-2004)
 No Premierships
 Casey Cardinia FL (2005-2014)
 2005
 South East FNL (2015-2018)
 No Premierships
 Outer East FNL (2019-2021)
 2019
 Southern FNL (2022-)
 No Premierships

VFL/AFL players
 Josh Battle - 
 Ron Beattie - 
 Don Henwood - 
 Connor MacDonald -  
 Scott Simister - 
 John Walker - 
 Daniel Wulf -

References

External Sources

Official Site

Australian rules football clubs in Melbourne
Southern Football League (Victoria)
Australian rules football clubs established in 1959
1959 establishments in Australia
Sport in the City of Casey